Kunszentmiklós is a town in Bács-Kiskun county, Hungary. The name is derived from the Cumans (Kun in Hungarian).

Twin cities 
 Cristuru Secuiesc  
 Blumberg  
 Skorenovac 
 Karcag 
 St. Julian's 
 Chepa

See also
Cuman people

References

External links 

  in Hungarian
 Térkép Kalauz – Kunszentmiklós
 Video Kunszentmiklósról – indulhatunk.hu
 Kunszentmiklós.lap.hu
 Kunszentmiklós Város Tűzoltósága

Populated places in Bács-Kiskun County
Towns in Hungary